Elbrus Tedeyev (born December 5, 1974, in Nogir, Prigorodny District, North Ossetian ASSR,  Soviet Union) is a Ukrainian wrestler and Olympic champion; he became a citizen of Ukraine in 1993. He won a gold medal at the 2004 Summer Olympics in Athens. He is a three-time world champion and the brother of Dzhambolat Tedeyev, who also represented Ukraine.

Tedeyev became People's Deputy of Ukraine in 2006 as an independent politician on the party list of Party of Regions, he was reelected on this list during early parliamentary elections in 2007 and again in 2012.

References

External links

1974 births
Living people
People from Prigorodny District, North Ossetia–Alania
Russian people of Ossetian descent
Ukrainian people of Ossetian descent
Ossetian people
Russian emigrants to Ukraine
Naturalized citizens of Ukraine
Olympic wrestlers of Ukraine
Wrestlers at the 1996 Summer Olympics
Wrestlers at the 2000 Summer Olympics
Ukrainian male sport wrestlers
Wrestlers at the 2004 Summer Olympics
Olympic gold medalists for Ukraine
Olympic bronze medalists for Ukraine
Olympic medalists in wrestling
Fifth convocation members of the Verkhovna Rada
Sixth convocation members of the Verkhovna Rada
Seventh convocation members of the Verkhovna Rada
Independent politicians in Ukraine
Party of Regions politicians
Ukrainian sportsperson-politicians
Medalists at the 2004 Summer Olympics
World Wrestling Championships medalists
Medalists at the 1996 Summer Olympics
Sportspeople from North Ossetia–Alania
Recipients of the Honorary Diploma of the Cabinet of Ministers of Ukraine
World Wrestling Champions